Don't Look Back: The Legend of Orpheus is a 2013 South Korean television series, starring Kim Nam-gil and Son Ye-jin. It aired on KBS2 from May 27 to July 30, 2013 on Mondays and Tuesdays at 21:55.

The series is the third installment of the revenge trilogy by director Park Chan-hong and writer Kim Ji-woo, following Resurrection in 2005 and The Devil in 2007.

Synopsis
Han Yi-soo’s (Kim Nam-gil) father is the chauffeur of the owners of Gaya Hotel Group, the family of Jo Hae-woo (Son Ye-jin).  The chauffeur is persuaded to take the blame for a hit-and-run accident caused by the drunken son of the family.  But when he changes his mind, he is murdered before he can recant.  Yi-soo, then a high schooler, tries to find out the truth and exonerate his father.  He calls Hae-woo, his first love, but a truck deliberately rams the phone box.  Following the attempt on his life, Yi-soo disappears and ends up in Japan, where a wealthy and influential Japanese-Korean businessman, Yoshimura Junichiro (Lee Jae-gu) adopts him.

12 years later he returns to Korea with a new identity as Japanese-Korean businessman Yoshimura Jun and carefully laid plans. Hae-woo, who believed that Yi-soo was dead, becomes a prosecutor to find out the truth about what happened to him.  She marries Oh Joon-young (Ha Seok-jin), the son of the Chief Prosecutor Oh Hyun-shik (Jung Won-Joon) and also a close friend of Yi-soo in their school days.  No one in Korea, including Hae-woo, recognizes Yi-soo, even though he constantly finds excuses to meet Hae-woo and even after Hae-woo realizes that Yi-soo is alive. Yi-soo and Hae-woo become caught between love and revenge.

Cast

Main characters
 Kim Nam-gil as Han Yi-soo/Yoshimura Jun/Kim Joon
Yeon Joon-seok as young Yi-soo
 Son Ye-jin as Jo Hae-woo, the only daughter and heir to Gaya Hotel Group, who refuses to live life as an heiress and becomes a prosecutor.
 Kyung Soo-jin as young Hae-woo
 Lee Jung-gil as Jo Sang-gook, Hae-woo's grandfather and CEO of Gaya Hotel Group.
 Ha Seok-jin as Oh Joon-young, Hae-woo's husband.
 Noh Young-hak as young Joon-young
 Lee Hanee as Jang Young-hee, Yi-soo's secretary.
 Nam Bo-ra as Han Yi-hyun, Yi-soo's sister.
 Ahn Seo-hyun as young Yi-hyun
 Park Won-sang as Detective Byun Bang-jin
 Kim Kyu-chul as Jo Eui-seon, Hae-woo's father.
 Lee Soo-hyuk as Kim Soo-hyun, prosecution office's investigator.

Supporting characters
 Lee Si-eon as Kim Dong-soo
 Oh Hee-joon as young Dong-soo
 Lee Jae-gu as Junichiro Yoshimura
 Jung Won-joong as Chief Prosecutor Oh Hyun-shik, Joon-young's father and Hae-woo's boss.
 Jung In-gi as Han Young-man, Yi-soo's father.
 Jung Kyung-soon as Mrs. Park
 Kim Min-sang as Jung Man-chul
 Jo Jae-wan as Detective Oh
 So Hee-jung as Kim Young-joo
 Choi Deok-moon as Kang Hee-soo
 Jung Ae-yeon as Lee Hwa-young
 Ham Sung-min as Lee-yu
 Joo Jin-mo as the old Korean man in Okinawa
 Min Sung-wook as reporter Jae Myung (cameo, episode 19-20)

Original soundtrack
 Shark's Tale - Various Artists
 천국과 지옥 사이 (Between Heaven and Hell) - BoA
 슬픈 동화 (Sad Story) - Chung Dong-ha of Boohwal
 Alone in the Dark - Various Artists
 몇 날 며칠 (Countless Days) - Na Yoon-kwon
 Lost - Various Artists
 지독한 사랑 (Poison Love) - Lim Jeong-hee
 Assassin - Various Artists
 고독한 왈츠 (Lonely Waltz) - Various Artists

Production
This production marked Son Ye-jin's return to television three years after Personal Taste in 2010, and the first acting project for Kim Nam-gil after being discharged from mandatory military service. Regarding his revenge trilogy, director Park Chan-hong explained that the first part, Resurrection focused on the man seeking revenge; then part two The Devil included the victim of revenge in the story; and the last part took into account both the victim and perpetrator in the structure of the story.

On April 29, 2013, the production company Annex Telecom released promotional stills of the two leads, Son Ye-jin and Kim Nam-gil, at the drama's first shoot on April 24–25 in Gangnam-gu, Seoul. This was followed by a 40 second teaser video on May 9, showing Kim and a shark swimming. Promoter Shall We Talk explained, "The reason we named the drama Shark and why Kim Nam-gil talks about sharks in the clip is because the lives of the two main characters are similar to that of sharks, which can't stop swimming."

Ratings
In the table below, the blue numbers represent the lowest ratings and the red numbers represent the highest ratings.

Awards and nominations

International broadcast
It aired in Japan on cable channel KNTV from October 25, 2013 to March 7, 2014, under the title . It was re-aired on cable channel BS-Japan beginning June 2014 on Saturdays and Sundays at 8:00 p.m. to 9:00 p.m.

In Thailand, the show aired on PPTVHD from April 7 to May 26, 2014 on Mondays and Tuesdays at 9:05 a.m. to  11:00 a.m.

References

External links
  
 
 
 
 Shark Korean Dramaice English

2013 South Korean television series debuts
2013 South Korean television series endings
Korean Broadcasting System television dramas
Korean-language television shows
South Korean romance television series
South Korean thriller television series
Zainichi Korean culture